Barry Wayne Stevens (November 7, 1963 – February 21, 2007) was an American basketball player. He was born in Flint, Michigan. Stevens is the third-leading scorer in Iowa State University history.

Stevens, a 6'5" (1.96 m) shooting guard, played professionally as well; briefly for the NBA's Golden State Warriors during 1992-93 season. Stevens played six total NBA minutes in two game appearances with the Warriors. He also played in Asia, South America and Europe.

From June 2001 to June 2002 he was both the director of basketball operations and head coach of the CBA's Gary Steelheads, lasting one season.

In February 2007, Stevens died of a heart attack while exercising in Gary, Indiana, aged 44. A celebrity all-star game was played in July 2007, in order to raise money for the Barry Stevens Foundation and the American Heart Association.

Notes

External links
NBA statistics @ basketballreference.com

1963 births
2007 deaths
African-American basketball coaches
African-American basketball players
American expatriate basketball people in Argentina
American men's basketball coaches
American men's basketball players
Basketball coaches from Michigan
Basketball players from Flint, Michigan
Cedar Rapids Silver Bullets players
Columbus Horizon players
Continental Basketball Association coaches
Golden State Warriors players
Fargo-Moorhead Fever players
Iowa State Cyclones men's basketball players
Rockford Lightning players
Shooting guards
Sportspeople from Flint, Michigan
Tri-City Chinook players
Wichita Falls Texans players
Wisconsin Flyers players
Wyoming Wildcatters players
20th-century African-American sportspeople
21st-century African-American people